Wolfert Gerritse Van Couwenhoven (1 May 1579 – 1662), also known as Wolphert Gerretse van Kouwenhoven and Wolphert Gerretse, was an original patentee, director of  (farms), and a founder of the New Netherland colony.

He and his wife, Neeltje Janse Jacobdochter, were one of the first Europeans to settle on Long Island, a farm he named New Amersfoort. He was a Schepen of New Amsterdam in 1654.  He is noted as playing an "active role in laying the foundations of the communities of Manhattan, Albany, Rensselaer, and Brooklyn."

Early Life
Wolfert was born on 1 May 1579 in Amersfoort, Netherlands, one of three sons of Gerrit Suype Van Kouwenhoven and his wife, Styne Sara Roberts.

Farm description 
A 1638 inventory for the farm named Achtervelt, owned by Wolfert Gerritse and Andries Hudde in what is now Flatlands, Brooklyn, describes the estate, which included a 40 by 18-foot barn:"...one house surrounded by long, round palisades; the house is 26 feet long, 22 feet wide, 40 feet high with the roof, covered above and all around with boards ... "

The deed for this farm was the first for Long Island, "and one of the very first for land in New York." The deed describes the land as "the westernmost of the flats called Keskateuw belonging to them on the island called Suan Hacky between the bay of the North river and the East River of New Netherland." The deed is signed by the Dutch colonial governor, Wouter von Twiller, at “Eylandt Manhatans” and reaffirmed on the back in 1658 by Gov. Peter Stuyvesant.The area purchased was part of a larger ares called, Keskateuw, meaning in the Lenape lanaguge, "where grass is cut."

Career

Dutch West India Company
Wolfert ran a baking and clothes bleaching business, when in 1625 he was assigned as one of the first settlers to cultivate farms in the New Netherlands colony by the Dutch West India Company.

Director of Bouweries for Kiliaen van Rensselaer
In 1630, he returned to the Netherlands, where he entered into a contract with his cousin Kiliaen Van Rensselaer to return to the colony to manage his farms. Wolphert arrived back in the colony aboard the ship "Eendracht", where he proceeded in his duties as director for van Rensselaer's farms in Rensselaerwyck and Fort Orange.

His contract was to run through 1636, but Gerretse requested it cancelled early so he could pursue his own interests. Rensselaer agreed. In 1632, Gerretse was released from his contractual obligations.

New Amersfoort
He called his plantation "Achervelt"; later it served as the founding of the town of New Amersfoort, named after Gerritse's original home. Today the area is known as Flatlands. His plantation was located near the current intersection of King's Highway and Flatbush Avenue.

In 2007 the deed of the granted land in Long Island was sold to a private collector for $156,000 becoming "one of the oldest Dutch documents in private hands". The deed dated 6 June 1636 is written in Dutch and outlines the purchase of the land (3,600-acre) from the Lenape Indians.

Public service
In 1637, he became a Freeholder in Midwout, and again in 1641. In 1653, he was sent by the colony to the States-General in the Netherlands as a Commissioner. In 1654, Wolphert served as a Schepen of New Amsterdam, and in 1657 was made a Burgher. He served on the citizens council of Eight Men.

Death 
Gerretse died in 1662.

Marriage and children
A member of the Dutch Reformed Church, on 17 January 1605, he married Neeltje Janse Jacobdochter in Amersfoort, Netherlands.

They had three sons:

Gerrit Wolfertsen Couwenhoven (1610–1648), a Representative at the Council of Eight in 1643
Jacob Wolphertse Suype Van Kouwenhoven (1612–1670), assistant to Gov. Woulter Van Twiller, Representative at the Board of Nine in 1647, 1649–1650, sat on the Court of Arbitrators between 1649 and 1650, Delegate of New Netherlands to the Hague in Holland
Pieter van Kouwenhoven (1614–1699), one of the first magistrates of New Netherlands, member of the Schepens Court 1653–1654, 1658–1659, 1661 and 1663, delegate from New Amsterdam to the Convention of 1653, Lieutenant in the Esopus War, signer of the peace treaty 1664 with the Esopus Indians
His granddaughter, Marretje Gerretse, daughter of Gerret, married Coert van Voorhees.

Descendants

Later variations on surname 
Some descendants of Wolfert anglicized the surname "Van Kouwenhoven" to "Kouwenhoven," "Kownover," "Conover," as well as "Crownover," with Dennis Conover (born 1764) being the first descendant (4th great grandson) to use "Conover" as his surname.

The progenitor of the Vanderbilt family, Jan Aertszoon (1620–1705), also known as Jan Aertson, a Dutch farmer from the village of De Bilt in Utrecht, Netherlands, emigrated to the Dutch colony of New Netherland as an indentured servant to the Van Kouwenhoven family in 1650.

Notable descendants
Figure Skating Coach Pam Gregory
U.S. Senator Sidney Breese
Astronomer John Monroe Van Vleck
 Governor William A. Newell (New Jersey) (founder United States Life-Saving Service)
Nobel Prize winner John Hasbrouck Van Vleck
Cardiology pioneer William B. Kouwenhoven
Philanthropist Edward Harriman
Diplomat William Harriman
Railroad baron E.H. Harriman
Vice-Admiral Arthur S. Carpender
Actress Diana Douglas (née Diana Dill; mother of actor Michael Douglas)
Actor Michael Douglas (by mother Diana)
Magician Tim Conover 
Honorary Consul of the Kingdom of Denmark, Christopher N. Smith
Tennis Player Andy Roddick
Governor Howard Dean
Inventor Lloyd Conover 
Associate Supreme Court Justice Willis Van Devanter
The Wright Brothers
Cyclist Lance Armstrong
Football Player Ryan Kalil
Football Player Matt Kalil
Actress Chrystie Crownover
Burton Jenner
Actress Caitlyn Jenner
Catherine Mellon Warner
Actor Humphrey Bogart
President Theodore Roosevelt
First Lady Eleanor Roosevelt
Seth Conover, which Conover, Wisconsin was named after.

Legacy
Gerritsen Beach, Brooklyn, New York
Kouwenhoven Lane, Brooklyn, New York
Conover, Wisconsin
Conover, North Carolina

References

External links

1579 births
1662 deaths
People from Amersfoort
People of New Netherland
People from Flatlands, Brooklyn